"Loving Wings" is a song by the American band Dave Matthews Band (DMB).  Having been released on 6 different live albums, "Loving Wings" is the most widely released song that has not been recorded for a studio album that Dave Matthews Band has released.  It has been fully played a total of 94 times during various concerts.

History of the song
The initial phase of the song began as an instrumental introduction to the song "Where Are You Going" having first been played live on May 10, 2002 at the Pepsi Center in Denver, Colorado.  Initially started as a guitar riff by Dave Matthews, by the summer of 2002 the song grew into the more commonly known version with every member of the band playing a part.

Live releases
The Gorge Dave Matthews Band
The Gorge Special Edition Dave Matthews Band
Dave Matthews Benaroya Hall, Seattle, WA 24 October 2002 DMBLive Series, Dave Matthews Solo
Live Trax Vol. 2: Golden Gate Park  DMB Live Trax Series, Dave Matthews Band
Live Trax Vol. 40: Madison Square Garden DMB Live Trax Series, Dave Matthews Band
Warehouse 5 Vol. 8 Warehouse Compilation, Dave Matthews Band
Warehouse 8 Vol. 5 Warehouse Compilation, Dave Matthews Band
Live In Las Vegas Dave Matthews and Tim Reynolds

References

External links
 dmbalmanac.com
 Music Releases | Dave Matthews Band Official Store

Dave Matthews Band songs
2002 singles
Songs written by Dave Matthews